Seomun clan of Aneum is one of the Korean clans. Their Bon-gwan is in Hamyang County, South Gyeongsang Province. According to the research held in 2015, the number of Seomun clan of Aneum was 1934. Seomun clan was a family name which has origin in Liang, China. Seomun clan has also origin of the name of a place that Scholar-official lived in Zheng during Eastern Zhou Period.

See also 
 Korean clan names of foreign origin

References

External links 
 

 
Korean clan names of Chinese origin